The Mill of Good Luck is a 1955 Romanian drama film directed by Victor Iliu. It was entered into the 1957 Cannes Film Festival. It is a version of the novella Moara cu noroc ("The lucky mill"), published in the collection Nuvele din popor (1881) by Ioan Slavici.

Cast

 Constantin Codrescu – Ghiță, the innkeeper
  – Lică Sămădăul, chief of the swineherds
 Ioana Bulcă (as Ioana Bulcă-Diaconescu) – Ana, Ghiță's wife
 Colea Răutu – Pintea, the gendarme
  – the old woman (as Marieta Rareș)
 Gheorghe Ghițulescu – Răut
 Benedict Dabija – Buză Ruptă ("Split Lip")
 I. Atanasiu-Atlas – Saila Boarul
 Willy Ronea – the commissar
 Valeria Gagialov – the lady in mourning
 Sandu Sticlaru – Martzi, the inn hand
 Aurel Cioranu – Lae
 George Manu (as G. Manu)

See also
 Orizont (2015 film)

References

External links

1955 films
Romanian drama films
1950s Romanian-language films
1955 drama films
Romanian black-and-white films
Films directed by Victor Iliu